Ingleside Road is a Tide Light Rail station in Norfolk, Virginia. It opened in August 2011 and is situated along Ingleside Road. The station primarily serves residents of adjacent neighborhoods.

References

External links 
Ingleside Road station

Tide Light Rail stations
Railway stations in the United States opened in 2011
2011 establishments in Virginia